HD 50554 is a single, Sun-like star with an exoplanetary companion in the northern constellation of Gemini. It has an apparent visual magnitude of +6.84, which makes it a 7th magnitude star; it is not visible to the naked eye, but can be viewed with binoculars or a telescope. The system is located at a distance of 102 light-years from the Sun based on parallax, but is drifting closer with a radial velocity of −4 km/s.

This is a yellow-white hued F-type main-sequence star with a stellar classification of F8V. Age estimates put it at around 2–3 billion years old. It has a Sun-like metallicity a low level of chromospheric activity and is spinning with a projected rotational velocity of 2.3 km/s. The star has a slightly higher mass and larger radius than the Sun. It is radiating 137% of the luminosity of the Sun from its photosphere at an effective temperature of 6,036 K.

In 2001, a giant planet was announced by the European Southern Observatory, who used the radial velocity method. The discovery was confirmed in 2002 using observations from the lick and keck telescopes. This may be an analog of the Kuiper belt at an earlier stage of its evolution, which suggests a Neptune-like planet could be orbiting at its inner edge.

See also 
 HD 50499
 List of extrasolar planets

References 

F-type main-sequence stars
Planetary systems with one confirmed planet
Circumstellar disks

Gemini (constellation)
Durchmusterung objects
050554
033212